Saint-Sauveur-sur-Tinée (literally Saint-Sauveur on Tinée; Vivaro-Alpine: Sant Sarvaor) is a commune in the Alpes-Maritimes department in the Provence-Alpes-Côte d'Azur region in southeastern France.

Population
Its inhabitants are called Blavets or Sansavornins.

See also
Communes of the Alpes-Maritimes department

References

Communes of Alpes-Maritimes
Alpes-Maritimes communes articles needing translation from French Wikipedia